Andreassen Point is a low ice-free point in northern James Ross Island, fronting on Herbert Sound,  south of Cape Lachman. Probably first seen by Otto Nordenskiöld in 1903, it was surveyed by the Falkland Islands Dependencies Survey in 1945, and named by the UK Antarctic Place-Names Committee for F.L. Andreassen, first mate on the Antarctic, the ship of the Swedish Antarctic Expedition, 1901–04.

References 

Headlands of James Ross Island